Robert Charles Becker (August 15, 1875 – October 11, 1951) was a Major League Baseball pitcher who played for two seasons. He pitched for the Philadelphia Phillies from 1897 to 1898, playing in six career games.

External links

1875 births
1951 deaths
Major League Baseball pitchers
Baseball players from Syracuse, New York
Philadelphia Phillies players
19th-century baseball players
Palmyra Mormans players
Rochester Brownies players
Montreal Royals players
Syracuse Stars (minor league baseball) players
Rochester Bronchos players
Hartford Indians players
Wooden Nutmegs players